The Hondo Railway  is a Class III shortline railroad that operates about  of trackage to the west of San Antonio, Texas. Roughly half of the railroad's track is terminal trackage leased from Texas Liquid Terminal, Inc. It was formed in 2006, and carries ethanol, food, agricultural products and industrial products.

References

External links

Picture of HRR locomotive

Texas railroads
Switching and terminal railroads